The S. Rae Hickok Professional Athlete of the Year award, known as the Hickok Belt, is a trophy that was awarded  from 1950 to 1976 (27 years) to the top professional athlete of the year in the United States, and then re-established in 2012. It was created by Ray and Alan Hickok in honor of their father, Stephen Rae Hickok, who had died unexpectedly in 1945 and had founded the Hickok Manufacturing Company of Rochester, New York, which made belts—hence the choice of a belt for the trophy.

The trophy was an alligator-skin belt with a solid-gold buckle, an encrusted 4-carat (800 mg) diamond, and 26 gem chips. It was valued at over $10,000 in the currency of the time (US$90,000 to $140,000 in 2011 dollars) and its presentation was a major event in sporting news of the day.

For the first 21 years, from 1950 to 1970, it was awarded in Rochester at the annual Rochester Press-Radio Club dinner (and continues today). After the Hickok company was taken over by the Tandy Corporation, the award was presented in larger cities such as Chicago or New York. The last award was made in 1976.

In 2010, Tony Liccione, the president of the Rochester Boxing Hall of Fame, announced plans to reinstate the Hickok Belt starting in 2012.  The mold for the belt starting in 1951 (the first belt in 1950 misspelled Hickok's name as "Ray") was found and planned to be used again.  Liccione invited the 18 surviving belt winners (except O. J. Simpson, who at the time was incarcerated in Nevada) to the Comeback Dinner, which was held on October 16, 2011 at St. John Fisher College.

Since being re-established in 2012, the award has been based on a vote by the National Sports Media Association; however, there have been no public award ceremonies or belt presentations.  A 20-member panel chooses one athlete each month, with the twelve monthly winners being eligible for the award at the end of the calendar year.   Of the awards given since 2012, two have been presented to LeBron James and two to Patrick Mahomes.

Winners

For a biographical sketch of each winner from 1950 to 1976, see footnote

Revived belt

References

External reference

American sports trophies and awards
United States Hickok
Awards established in 1950
Awards disestablished in 1977
Awards established in 2012
Sports in Rochester, New York
1950 establishments in the United States
1977 disestablishments in the United States
2012 establishments in the United States